Qatar hosted and competed in the 15th Asian Games, officially known as the XV Asiad held in Doha from December 1 to December 15, 2006. Qatar ranked 9th with 9 gold medals in this edition of the Asiad.

Medalists

References

Nations at the 2006 Asian Games
2006
Asian Games